Diplazium dietrichianum is a small fern occurring in eastern Australia. It occurs in shady damp places.

References

dietrichianum
Flora of New South Wales
Flora of Queensland
Ferns of Australia